Human germline engineering is the process by which the genome of an individual is edited in such a way that the change is heritable. This is achieved through genetic alterations within the germ cells, or the reproductive cells, such as the egg and sperm. Human germline engineering is a type of genetic modification that directly manipulates the genome using molecular engineering techniques.  Aside from germline engineering, genetic modification can be applied in another way, somatic genetic modification. Somatic gene modification consists of altering somatic cells, which are all cells in the body that are not involved in reproduction. While somatic gene therapy does change the genome of the targeted cells, these cells are not within the germline, so the alterations are not heritable and cannot be passed on to the next generation.

For safety, ethical, and social reasons, there is broad agreement among the scientific community and the public that germline editing for reproduction is a red line that should not be crossed at this point in time. There are differing public sentiments, however, on whether it may be performed in the future depending on if the intent would be therapeutic or non-therapeutic.

Using germline editing for reproduction is prohibited by law in more than 70 countries and by a binding international treaty of the Council of Europe. However, in November 2015, a group of Chinese scientists used the gene-editing technique CRISPR/Cas9 to edit single-celled, non-viable embryos to see the effectiveness of this technique. This attempt was rather unsuccessful; only a small fraction of the embryos successfully incorporated the new genetic material and many of the embryos contained a large number of random mutations. The non-viable embryos that were used contained an extra set of chromosomes, which may have been problematic. In 2016, another similar study was performed in China which also used non-viable embryos with extra sets of chromosomes. This study showed very similar results to the first; there were successful integrations of the desired gene, yet the majority of the attempts failed, or produced undesirable mutations.

In an experiment in August 2017, the correction of the heterozygous MYBPC3 mutation associated with hypertrophic cardiomyopathy in human embryos was attempted with precise CRISPR–Cas9 targeting. 52% of human embryos were successfully edited to retain only the wild type normal copy of MYBPC3 gene, the rest of the embryos were mosaic, where some cells in the zygote contained the normal gene copy and some contained the mutation.

In November 2018, researcher He Jiankui claimed that he had created the first human genetically edited babies, known by their pseudonyms, Lulu and Nana. In May 2019, lawyers in China reported, in light of the purported creation by He Jiankui of the first gene-edited humans, the drafting of regulations that anyone manipulating the human genome by gene-editing techniques, like CRISPR, would be held responsible for any related adverse consequences.

CRISPR-cas9 

Genome editing is a group of technologies that give scientists the ability to change an organism's DNA. These technologies allow genetic material to be added,  removed, or altered at particular locations in the genome. Several approaches to genome editing have been developed. CRISPR-Cas9, which is short for clustered regularly interspaced short palindromic repeats and CRISPR-associated protein 9, is the most effective gene-editing technique to date.

The CRISPR-Cas9 system consists of two key molecules that introduce a change into the DNA. An enzyme called Cas9, acts as a pair of ‘molecular scissors’ that can cut the two strands of DNA at a specific location in the genome so that specific pieces of DNA can then be added or removed. A piece of RNA called guide RNA (gRNA) that consists of a small piece of pre-designed RNA sequence (about 20 bases long) located within a longer RNA scaffold. The scaffold part binds to DNA and the pre-designed sequence ‘guides’ Cas9 to the right part of the genome. This makes sure that the Cas9 enzyme cuts at the right point in the genome.

The guide RNA is designed to find and bind to a specific sequence in the DNA. The gRNA has RNA bases that are complementary to those of the target DNA sequence in the genome. This means that, the guide RNA will only bind to the target sequence and no other regions of the genome. The Cas9 follows the guide RNA to the same location in the DNA sequence and makes a cut across both strands of the DNA. At this stage the cell recognizes that the DNA is damaged and tries to repair it.  Scientists can use the DNA repair machinery to introduce changes to one or more genes in the genome of a cell of interest.

Although the CRISPR/Cas9 can be used in humans, it is more commonly used by scientists in other animal models or cell culture systems, including in experiments to learn more about genes that could be involved in human diseases. Clinical trials are being conducted on somatic cells, but CRISPR could make it possible to modify the DNA of spermatogonial stem cells. This could eliminate certain diseases in humans, or at least significantly decrease a disease's frequency until it eventually disappears over generations. Cancer survivors theoretically would be able to have their genes modified by the CRISPR/cas9 so that certain diseases or mutations will not be passed down to their offspring. This could possibly eliminate cancer predispositions in humans. Researchers hope that they can use the system in the future to treat currently incurable diseases by altering the genome altogether.

Conceivable uses 

The Berlin Patient has a genetic mutation in the CCR5 gene (which codes for a protein on the surface of white blood cells, targeted by the HIV virus) that deactivates the expression of CCR5, conferring innate resistance to HIV. HIV/AIDS carries a large disease burden and is incurable (see Epidemiology of HIV/AIDS). One proposal is to genetically modify human embryos to give the CCR5 Δ32 allele to people.

There are many prospective uses such as curing genetic diseases and disorders. If perfected, somatic gene editing can promise helping people who are sick. In the first study published regarding human germline engineering, the researchers attempted to edit the HBB gene which codes for the human β-globin protein. Mutations in the HBB gene result in the disorder β-thalassaemia, which can be fatal. Perfect editing of the genome in patients who have these HBB mutations would result in copies of the gene which do not possess any mutations, effectively curing the disease. The importance of editing the germline would be to pass on this normal copy of the HBB genes to future generations.

Another possible use of human germline engineering would be eugenic modifications to humans which would result in what are known as "designer babies". The concept of a "designer baby" is that its entire genetic composition could be selected for. In an extreme case, people would be able to effectively create the offspring that they want, with a genotype of their choosing. Not only does human germline engineering allow for the selection of specific traits, but it also allows for enhancement of these traits. Using human germline editing for selection and enhancement is currently very heavily scrutinized, and the main driving force behind the movement of trying to ban human germline engineering.

In a 2019 animal study with Liang Guang Small Spotted pigs, increased muscle mass was achieved with precise editing of the myostatin signal peptide. Myostatin is a negative regulator of muscle growth, so through mutating the signal peptide regions of the gene, muscle growth could be promoted in the experimental pigs. The Myostatin genes in 955 pig embryos were mutated at several locations with CRISPR and implanted into five surrogates, resulting in 16 piglets. It was found that only specific mutations to the myostatin signal peptide resulted in increased muscle mass in the piglets mainly due to an increase in muscle fibers. A similar animal study created a knockout in the myostatin gene in mice, which also increased their muscle mass. This showed that muscle mass could be increased with germline editing, which is likely applicable to humans because humans also have the myostatin gene to regulate muscle growth. Human germline engineering may then result in intentionally increased muscle mass, with applications such as gene doping.

The ability to germline engineer human genetic codes would be the beginning of eradicating incurable diseases such as HIV/AIDS, sickle-cell anemia and multiple forms of cancer that we cannot stop nor cure today. Scientists having the technology to not only eradicate those existing diseases but to prevent them altogether in fetuses would bring a whole new generation of medical technology. There are numerous disease that humans and other mammals obtain that are fatal because scientists have not found a methodized ways to treat them. With germline engineering, doctors and scientists would have the ability to prevent known and future diseases from becoming an epidemic.

State of research 

The topic of human germline engineering is a widely debated topic. It is formally outlawed in more than 40 countries. Currently, 15 of 22 Western European nations have outlawed human germline engineering. Human germline modification has been for many years heavily off limits.  There is no current legislation in the United States that explicitly prohibits germline engineering, however, the Consolidated Appropriation Act of 2016 banned the use of U.S. Food and Drug Administration (FDA) funds to engage in research regarding human germline modifications. In recent years, as new founding is known as "gene editing" or "genome editing" has promoted speculation about their use in human embryos. In 2014, it has been said about researchers in the US and China working on human embryos. In April 2015, a research team published an experiment in which they used CRISPR to edit a gene that is associated with blood disease in non-living human embryos. All these experiments were unsuccessful, but gene editing tools are used in labs.

Scientists using the CRISPR/cas9 system to modify genetic materials have run into issues when it comes to mammalian alterations due to the complex diploid cells. Studies have been done in microorganisms regarding loss of function genetic screening and some studies using mice as a subject. RNA processes differ between bacteria and mammalian cells and scientists have had difficulties coding for mRNA's translated data without the interference of RNA. Studies have been done using the cas9 nuclease that uses a single guide RNA to allow for larger knockout regions in mice which was successful. Altering the genetic sequence of mammals has also been widely debated thus creating a difficult FDA regulation standard for these studies.

The lack of clear international regulation has led to researchers across the globe attempting to create an international framework of ethical guidelines. Current framework lacks the requisite treaties among nations to create a mechanism for international enforcement. At the first International Summit on Human Gene Editing in December 2015 the collaboration of scientists issued the first international guidelines on genetic research. These guidelines allow for the pre-clinical research into the editing of genetic sequences in human cells granted the embryos are not used to implant pregnancy. Genetic alteration of somatic cells for therapeutic proposes was also considered an ethically acceptable field of research in part due to the lack of ability of somatic cells to transfer genetic material to subsequent generations. However citing the lack of social consensus, and the risk of inaccurate gene editing the conference called for restraint on any germline modifications on implanted embryos intended for pregnancy.

With the international outcry in response to the first recorded case of human germ line edited embryos being implanted by researcher He Jiankui, scientists have continued discussion on the best possible mechanism for enforcement of an international framework. On March 13, 2019 researchers Eric Lander, Françoise Baylis, Feng Zhang, Emmanuelle Charpentier, Paul Bergfrom along with others across the globe published a call for a framework that does not foreclose any outcome but includes a voluntary pledge by nations along with a coordinating body to monitor the application of pledged nations in a moratorium on human germline editing with an attempt to reach social consensus before moving forward into further research. The World Health Organization announced on December 18, 2018 plans to convene an intentional committee on clinical germline editing.

Current global policy 
There is distinction in some country policies, including but not limited to official regulation and legislation, between human germline engineering for reproductive use and for laboratory research. As of October 2020, there are 96 countries that have policies involving the use of germline engineering in human cells.

Global Policies for Reproductive Use 
Reproductive use of human germline engineering involves implanting the edited embryo to be born. 70 countries currently explicitly prohibit the use of human germline engineering for use in reproduction, while 5 countries prohibit it for reproduction with exceptions. No countries permit the use of human germline engineering for reproduction.

Countries that explicitly prohibit any use of human germline engineering for reproduction are: Albania, Argentina, Australia, Austria, Bahrain, Belarus, Benin, Bosnia and Herzegovina, Brazil, Bulgaria, Burundi, Canada, Chile, China, Congo, Costa Rica, Croatia, Cyprus, Czech Republic, Denmark, Estonia, Finland, France, Georgia, Germany, Greece, Hungary, Iceland, India, Iran, Ireland, Israel, Japan, Kenya, Latvia, Lebanon, Lithuania, Malaysia, Malta, Mexico, Moldova, Montenegro, Netherlands, New Zealand, Nigeria, North Macedonia, Norway, Oman, Pakistan, Poland, Portugal, Qatar, Romania, Russia, San Marino, Saudi Arabia, Serbia, Slovakia, Slovenia, South Korea, Spain, Sweden, Switzerland, Thailand, Tunisia, Turkey, the United Kingdom, the United States, Uruguay, and the Vatican

Countries that explicitly prohibit (with exceptions) the use of human germline engineering for reproduction are: Belgium, Colombia, Italy, Panama, and the United Arab Emirates

Global Policies for Laboratory Research 
Laboratory research use involves human germline engineering restricted to in vitro use, where edited cells will not be implanted to be born. 19 countries currently explicitly prohibit any use of human germline engineering for in vitro use, while 4 prohibit it with exceptions, and 11 permit it.

Countries that explicitly prohibit any use of germline engineering for in vitro use are: Albania, Austria, Bahrain, Belarus, Brazil, Canada, Costa Rica, Croatia, Germany, Greece, Lebanon, Malaysia, Malta, Pakistan, Saudi Arabia, Sweden, Switzerland, Uruguay, and the Vatican

Countries that explicitly prohibit (with exceptions) the use of germline engineering for in vitro use are: Colombia, Finland, Italy, and Panama

Countries that explicitly permit the use of germline engineering for in vitro use are: Burundi, China, Congo, India, Iran, Ireland, Japan, Norway, Thailand, the United Kingdom, and the United States

Ethical and moral debates 

As it stands, there is controversy surrounding human germline engineering. 
As early in the history of biotechnology as 1990, there have been scientists opposed to attempts to modify the human germline using these new tools, and such concerns have continued as technology progressed. With the advent of new techniques like CRISPR, in March 2015 a group of scientists urged a worldwide moratorium on clinical use of gene editing technologies to edit the human genome in a way that can be inherited.  In April 2015, researchers reported results of basic research to edit the DNA of non-viable human embryos using CRISPR, creating controversy. A committee of the American National Academy of Sciences and National Academy of Medicine gave support to human genome editing in 2017 once answers have been found to safety and efficiency problems "but only for serious conditions under stringent oversight."

Editing the genes of human embryos raises its own social and ethical concerns. The scientific community, and global community, have division regarding whether or not human germline engineering should be practiced or not. It is currently banned in many of the leading, developed countries, and highly regulated in the others due to ethical issues.

The American Medical Association’s Council on Ethical and Judicial Affairs stated that "genetic interventions to enhance traits should be considered permissible only in severely restricted situations: (1) clear and meaningful benefits to the fetus or child; (2) no trade-off with other characteristics or traits; and (3) equal access to the genetic technology, irrespective of income or other socioeconomic characteristics."

Ethical claims about germline engineering include beliefs that every fetus has a right to remain genetically unmodified, that parents hold the right to genetically modify their offspring, and that every child has the right to be born free of preventable diseases. For parents, genetic engineering could be seen as another child enhancement technique to add to diet, exercise, education, training, cosmetics, and plastic surgery. Another theorist claims that moral concerns limit but do not prohibit germline engineering.

One issue related to human genome editing relates to the impact of the technology on future individuals whose genes are modified without their consent. Clinical ethics accepts the idea that parents are, almost always, the most appropriate surrogate medical decision makers for their children until the children develop their own autonomy and decision-making capacity. This is based on the assumption that, except under rare circumstances, parents have the most to lose or gain from a decision and will ultimately make decisions that reflects the future values and beliefs of their children. According to this assumption, it could be assumed that parents are the most appropriate decision makers for their future children as well. There are anecdotal reports of children and adults who disagree with the medical decisions made by a parent during pregnancy or early childhood, such as when death was a possible outcome. There are also published patient stories by individuals who feel that they would not wish to change or remove their own medical condition if given the choice and individuals who disagree with medical decisions made by their parents during childhood.

Other scientists and philosophers have noted that the issue of the lack of prior consent applies as well to individuals born via traditional sexual reproduction. Philosopher David Pearce further argues that “old-fashioned sexual reproduction is itself an untested genetic experiment”, often compromising a child’s wellbeing and pro-social capacities even if the child grows in a healthy environment. According to Pearce, “the question of [human germline engineering] comes down to an analysis of risk-reward ratios - and our basic ethical values, themselves shaped by our evolutionary past.” Bioethicist Julian Savulescu in turn proposes the principle of procreative beneficence, according to which “couples (or single reproducers) should select the child, of the possible children they could have, who is expected to have the best life, or at least as good a life as the others, based on the relevant, available information”. Some ethicists argue that the principle of procreative beneficence would justify or even require genetically enhancing one's children.

The other ethical concern lies in the principle of “Designer Babies” or the creation of humans with "perfect", or "desirable" traits. There is a debate as to if this is morally acceptable as well. Such debate ranges from the ethical obligation to use safe and efficient technology to prevent disease to seeing some actual benefit in genetic disabilities.
There are concerns that the introduction of desirable traits in a certain part of the population (instead of the entire population) could cause economic inequalities (“positional” good). However, this isn't the case if a same desirable trait would be introduced over the entire population (similar to vaccines).

There are disagreements between religion and science, however the topic of human germline engineering has some unity between the two fields. Several religious positions have been published with regards to human germline engineering. According to them, many see germline modification as being more moral than the alternative, which would be either discarding of the embryo, or birth of a diseased human. The main conditions when it comes to whether or not it is morally and ethically acceptable lie within the intent of the modification, and the conditions in which the engineering is done.

The process of modifying the human genome has raised ethical questions. One of the issues is “off target effects”, large genomes may contain identical or homologous DNA sequences, and the enzyme complex CRISPR/Cas9 may unintentionally cleave these DNA sequences causing mutations that may lead to cell death. The mutations can cause important genes to be turned on or off, such as genetic anti-cancer mechanisms, that could speed up disease exasperation.

Other ethical concerns are: unintentionally editing the human germline forever, not knowing how one change to a human germline will affect the expression of the remainder of the genes. A scientist recently made an analogy to increase understanding in regard to mapping and manipulating the human genome / germline in relation to a stage play: it is if we have very precise character descriptions (the mapped genome), and yet we (the scientific community) have no idea yet how the characters interact with each other. In other words, if one makes one change to the human germline, what other cascade of changes might we be making?

Another ethical concern pertains to potential unequal distribution of benefits, even in the case of genome editing being inexpensive. For example, corporations may be able to take unfair advantage of patent law or other ways of restricting access to genome editing and thereby may increase the inequalities. There are already disputes in the courts where CRISPR-Cas9 patents and access issues are being negotiated.

There remains debate on if the permissibility of human germline engineering for reproduction is dependent on the use, being either a therapeutic or non-therapeutic application. In a survey by the UK's Royal Society, 76% of participants in the UK supported therapeutic human germline engineering to prevent or correct disease, however for non-therapeutic edits such as enhancing intelligence or altering eye or hair color in embryos, there was only 40% and 31% support, respectively. There was a similar result in a study at the University of Bogota, Columbia, where students as well as professors generally agreed that therapeutic genome editing is acceptable, while non-therapeutic genome editing is not.

There is also debate on if there can be a defined distinction between therapeutic and non-therapeutic germline editing. An example would be if two embryos are predicted to grow up to be very short in height. Boy 1 will be short because of a mutation in his Human Growth Hormone gene, while boy 2 will be short because his parents are very short. Editing the embryo of boy 1 to make him of average height would be a therapeutic germline edit, while editing the embryo of boy 2 to be of average height would be a non-therapeutic germline edit. In both cases with no editing of the boys' genomes they would both grow up to be very short, which would decrease their wellbeing in life. Likewise editing both of the boys' genomes would allow them to grow up to be of average height. In this scenario, editing for the same phenotype for being of average height falls under both therapeutic and non-therapeutic germline engineering.

Genetically modified humans and designer babies 

A genetically modified human contains a genetic makeup that has been selected or altered, often to include a particular gene or to remove genes associated with the disease. This process usually involves analyzing human embryos to identify genes associated with the disease, and selecting embryos that have the desired genetic makeup - a process known as a preimplantation genetic diagnosis. 
Pre-implantation genetic diagnosis (PGD or PIGD) is a procedure in which embryos are screened prior to implantation. The technique is used alongside in vitro fertilization (IVF) to obtain embryos for evaluation of the genome – alternatively, ovocytes can be screened prior to fertilization. The technique was first used in 1989.

PGD is used primarily to select embryos for implantation in the case of possible genetic defects, allowing identification of mutated or disease-related alleles and selection against them. It is especially useful in embryos from parents where one or both carry a heritable disease. PGD can also be used to select for embryos of a certain sex, most commonly when a disease is more strongly associated with one sex than the other (as is the case for X-linked disorders which are more common in males, such as hemophilia). Infants born with traits selected following PGD are sometimes considered to be designer babies.

One application of PGD is the selection of ‘savior siblings’, children who are born to provide a transplant (of an organ or group of cells) to a sibling with a usually life-threatening disease. Savior siblings are conceived through IVF and then screened using PGD to analyze genetic similarity to the child needing a transplant, in order to reduce the risk of rejection.

PGD technique 

Embryos for PGD are obtained from IVF procedures in which the oocyte is artificially fertilized by sperm. Oocytes from the woman are harvested following controlled ovarian hyper stimulation (COH), which involves fertility treatments to induce production of multiple oocytes. After harvesting the oocytes, they are fertilized in vitro, either during incubation with multiple sperm cells in culture, or via intracytoplasmic sperm injection(ICSI), where sperm is directly injected into the oocyte. Such tests include amniocentesis, ultrasounds, and other preimplantation genetic diagnostic tests. These tests are quite common, and reliable, as we talk about them today; however, in the past when they were first introduced, they too were scrutinized. The resulting embryos are usually cultured for 3–6 days, allowing them to reach the blastomere or blastocyst stage.Once embryos reach the desired stage of development, cells are biopsied and genetically screened. The screening procedure varies based on the nature of the disorder being investigated.
Polymerase chain reaction (PCR) is a process in which DNA sequences are amplified to produce many more copies of the same segment, allowing screening of large samples and identification of specific genes. The process is often used when screening for monogenic disorders, such as cystic fibrosis.

Another screening technique, fluorescent in situ hybridization (FISH) uses fluorescent probes which specifically bind to highly complementary sequences on chromosomes, which can then be identified using fluorescence microscopy. FISH is often used when screening for chromosomal abnormalities such as aneuploidy, making it a useful tool when screening for disorders such as Down syndrome.

Following screening, embryos with the desired trait (or lacking an undesired trait such as a mutation) are transferred into the mother's uterus, then allowed to develop naturally.

He Jiankui controversy and research 

On 25 November 2018, two days before the Second International Summit on Human Genome Editing in Hong Kong, Jian-kui HE, a Chinese researcher of the Southern University of Science and Technology, released a video on YouTube announcing that he and his colleagues have “created” the world’s first genetically altered babies, Lulu and Nana.

HE explained the details of his experiment -  in his address at the Hong Kong conference. HE and his team had recruited eight couples through an HIV volunteer group named Baihualin (BHL) China League (one couple later withdrew from the research). All the male participants are HIV-positive, and all female participants are HIV-negative. The participants’ sperm was “washed off” to get rid of HIV and then injected into eggs collected from the female participants. By using clustered regularly interspaced short palindromic repeat (CRISPR)-Cas9, a gene editing technique, they disabled a gene called CCR5 in the embryos, aiming to close the protein doorway that allows HIV to enter a cell and make the subjects immune to the HIV virus. The process led to at least one successful pregnancy and the birth of the twin baby girls, Lulu and Nana. Researcher Alcino J. Silva has discovered an impact the CCR5 gene has on the memory function the brain.
A major concern has been that He Jiankui’s attempts to cripple CCR5, the gene for a protein on immune cells that HIV uses to infect the cells, also made “off-target” changes elsewhere in the girls’ genomes. Those changes could cause cancer or other problems. He contends that the babies have no such off-target mutations, although some scientists are skeptical of the evidence offered so far.

People inherit two copies of CCR5, one from each parent. He chose the gene as a target because he knew that about 1% of Northern European populations are born with both copies missing 32 base pairs, resulting in a truncated protein that doesn’t reach the cell surface. These people, known as CCR5Δ32 homozygotes, appear healthy and are highly resistant to HIV infection.
In the embryos, He’s team designed CRISPR to cut CCR5 at the base pair at one end of the natural deletion. The error-prone cell-repair mechanism, which CRISPR depends on to finish knocking out genes, then deleted 15 base pairs in one of Lulu’s copies of the gene, but none in the other. With one normal CCR5, she is expected to have no protection from HIV. Nana, according to the data He presented in a slide at an international genome-editing summit held in November 2018 in Hong Kong, China, had bases added to one CCR5 copy and deleted from the other, which likely would cripple both genes and provide HIV resistance.

He added the genes for the CRISPR machinery almost immediately after each embryo was created through in vitro fertilization, but several researchers who closely studied the slide caution that it may have done its editing after Nana’s embryo was already past the one-cell stage. That means she could be a genetic “mosaic” who has some unaffected cells with normal CCR5—and ultimately might have no protection from HIV.

Aside from the primary HIV concerns, the gene edits may have inadvertently altered cognitive function. Researchers showed in 2016 that knocking out one or both CCR5s in mice enhances their memory and cognition. A subsequent study that crippled CCR5 in mice found that, compared with control animals, the mutants recovered from strokes more quickly and had improved motor and cognitive functions following traumatic brain injury. The later study, in the 21 February issue of Cell, also included an analysis of 68 stroke patients who had one copy of CCR5 with the HIV resistance mutation; it concluded they had improved recovery, too.

On the night of 26 November, 122 Chinese scientists issued a statement strongly condemning HE’s action as unethical. They stated that while CRISPR-Cas is not a new technology, it involves serious off-target risks and associated ethical considerations, and so should not be used to produce gene-altered babies. They described HE’s experiment as “crazy” and “a huge blow to the global reputation and development of Chinese science”. The Scientific Ethics Committee of the Academic Divisions of the Chinese Academy of Sciences posted a statement declaring their opposition to any clinical use of genome editing on human embryos, noting that “the theory is not reliable, the technology is deficient, the risks are uncontrollable, and ethics and regulations prohibit the action”.  The Chinese Academy of Engineering released a statement on 28 November, calling on scientists to improve self-discipline and self-regulation, and to abide by corresponding ethical principles, laws, and regulations. Finally, the Chinese Academy of Medical Sciences published a correspondence in The Lancet, stating that they are “opposed to any clinical operation of human embryo genome editing for reproductive purposes."

Major studies of influence 

The first known publication of research into human germline editing was by a group of Chinese scientists in April 2015 in the Journal "Protein and Cell". The scientists used tripronuclear (3PN) zygotes, zygotes fertilized by two sperm and therefore non-viable, to investigate CRISPR/Cas9-mediated gene editing in human cells, something that had never been attempted before. The scientists found that while CRISPR/Cas9 could effectively cleave the β-globin gene (HBB), the efficiency of homologous recombination directed repair of HBB was highly inefficient and did not do so in a majority of the trials. Problems arose such as off target cleavage and the competitive recombination of the endogenous delta-globin with the HBB led to unexpected mutation. The results of the study indicated that repair of HBB in the embryos occurred preferentially through alternative pathways. In the end only 4 of the 54 zygotes carried the intended genetic information, and even then the successfully edited embryos were mosaics containing the preferential genetic code and the mutation. The conclusion of the scientists was that further effort was needed in to improve the precision and efficiency of CRISPER/Cas9 gene editing.

In March 2017 a group of Chinese scientists claimed to have edited three normal viable human embryos out of six total in the experiment. The study showed that CRISPR/Cas9 is could effectively be used as a gene-editing tool in human 2PN zygotes, which could lead potentially pregnancy viable if implanted. The scientists used injection of Cas9 protein complexed with the relevant sgRNAs and homology donors into human embryos. The scientists found homologous recombination-mediated alteration in HBB and G6PD. The scientists also noted the limitations of their study and called for further research.

In August 2017 a group of scientists from Oregon published an article in Nature journal detailing the successful use of CRISPR to edit out a mutation responsible for congenital heart disease.  The study looked at heterozygous MYBPC3 mutation in human embryos. The study claimed precise CRISPR/Cas9 and homology-directed repair response with high accuracy and precision. Double-strand breaks at the mutant paternal allele were repaired using the homologous wild-type gene. By modifying the cell cycle stage at which the DSB was induced, they were able to avoid mosaicism, which had been seen in earlier similar studies, in cleaving embryos and achieve a large percentage of homozygous embryos carrying the wild-type MYBPC3 gene without evidence of unintended mutations. The scientists concluded that the technique may be used for the correction of mutations in human embryos. The claims of this study were however pushed back on by critics who argued the evidence was overall unpersuasive.

In June 2018 a group of scientists published and article in "Nature" journal indicating a potential link for edited cells having increased potential turn cancerous. The scientists reported that genome editing by CRISPR/Cas9 induced DNA damage response and the cell cycle stopped. The study was conducted in human retinal pigment epithelial cells, and the use of CRISPR led to a selection against cells with a functional p53 pathway. The conclusion of the study would suggest that p53 inhibition might increase efficiency of human germline editing and that p53 function would need to be watched when developing CRISPR/Cas9 based therapy.

In November 2018 a group of Chinese scientists published research in the journal "Molecular Therapy" detailing their use of CRISPR/Cas9 technology to correct a single mistaken amino acid successfully in 16 out of 18 attempts in a human embryo. The unusual level of precision was achieved by the use of a base editor (BE) system which was constructed by fusing the deaminase to the dCas9 protein. The BE system efficiently edits the targeted C to T or G to A without the use of a donor and without DBS formation. The study focused on the FBN1 mutation that is causative for Marfan syndrome. The study provides proof positive for the corrective value of gene therapy for the FBN1 mutation in both somatic cells and germline cells. The study is noted for its relative precision which is a departure from past results of CRISPR/Cas9 studies.

See also 
 Human genetic engineering
 Gene therapy
 Germinal choice technology
 Human genetic enhancement
 CRISPR
 Designer Baby

References

Further reading 
 
 
 
 

Genetics
Genome editing
Biotechnology in China
2010s in biotechnology